Alexandra of Cumberland (Alexandra Louise Marie Olga Elisabeth Therese Vera; 29 September 1882 – 30 August 1963) was the wife of Frederick Francis IV, Grand Duke of Mecklenburg-Schwerin. As such, she was the last consort Mecklenburg-Schwerin from their marriage on 7 June 1904 until the Grand Duke abdicated on 14 November 1918, following the German Revolution of 1918. Alexandra was the daughter of Ernest Augustus, Crown Prince of Hanover, and Princess Thyra of Denmark.

Family
Alexandra was the second eldest daughter and third child of Ernest Augustus, Crown Prince of Hanover (1845–1923) and Princess Thyra of Denmark (1853–1933), the youngest daughter of Christian IX of Denmark (1818–1906) and Louise of Hesse-Kassel (1817–1898). Alexandra was a great-great-granddaughter of George III of the United Kingdom (1738–1820) and Charlotte of Mecklenburg-Strelitz (1744–1818).

Marriage and issue
Alexandra married on 7 June 1904 in Gmunden, Austria-Hungary to Frederick Francis IV, Grand Duke of Mecklenburg-Schwerin (1882–1945), son of Frederick Francis III, Grand Duke of Mecklenburg-Schwerin and his wife Grand Duchess Anastasia Mikhailovna of Russia. The bridegroom gave Alexandra a diamond and aquamarine tiara by Faberge.

Alexandra and Frederick Francis had five children:

Friedrich Franz, Hereditary Grand Duke of Mecklenburg-Schwerin  (22 April 1910 – 31 July 2001). Married Karin Elisabeth von Schaper, daughter of Walter von Schaper and his wife Baroness Louise von Münchhausen. The couple had no issue.
Duke Christian Louis of Mecklenburg (29 September 1912– 18 July 1996). Married Princess Barbara of Prussia, daughter of Prince Sigismund of Prussia and Princess Charlotte of Saxe-Altenburg. The couple had issue.
Duchess Olga of Mecklenburg-Schwerin (1916–1917).
Duchess Thyra of Mecklenburg-Schwerin (18 June 1919 – 27 September 1981).
Duchess Anastasia of Mecklenburg-Schwerin (11 November 1923 – 25 January 1979). Married Prince Friedrich Ferdinand of Schleswig-Holstein-Sonderburg-Glücksburg, son of Prince Albrecht of Schleswig-Holstein-Sonderburg-Glücksburg and Countess Ortrud of Ysenburg and Büdingen. The couple had issue.

In 1913, a fire broke out at Schwerin Castle while the Grand Duke and Duchess were dining there with guests. Everyone was able to make it out safely, although the grand ducal couple had to apparently rush through flying sparks when making their escape. There were a reported $750,000 in damages, in which countless works of art, as well as important rooms were utterly destroyed. Certain reports blamed the fire on a vengeful servant, although an official court announcement stated it was merely an electrical issue.

Honours
  Mecklenburg: Grand Cross of the Wendish Crown, with Crown in Ore and in Diamonds
 : Dame of the Order of Louise, 1st Division

Ancestry

References 

|-

House of Hanover
House of Mecklenburg-Schwerin
1882 births
1963 deaths
British princesses
Hanoverian princesses
People from Gmunden
Duchesses of Mecklenburg-Schwerin
Grand Duchesses of Mecklenburg-Schwerin